The following is a list of concept cars and prototypes bearing the Lancia badge or based on Lancia vehicles, built by the manufacturer itself or by third-party designers and coachbuilders.

References

Lists of cars